Vincent Stuart Callard (22 November 1895 – 18 July 1976) was a Canadian long-distance runner. He competed in the men's 5000 metres at the 1928 Summer Olympics.

References

External links
 

1895 births
1976 deaths
Athletes (track and field) at the 1928 Summer Olympics
Canadian male long-distance runners
Olympic track and field athletes of Canada
Place of birth missing